Clementia ( 1145–1179/81) was the countess of Catanzaro in the Kingdom of Sicily. She played a major role in the baronial rebellion of 1160–62.

Clementia was the daughter and heiress of Count Raymond of Catanzaro and Segelgarda (Sikilgarda). Her father succeeded his own brother, Geoffrey, probably shortly before 1145. Clementia's date of birth is unknown. She is first recorded in a charter of her grandmother, Bertha, who made a donation for the soul of her son Geoffrey in December 1145.

Clementia had succeeded her father by early 1158, but she was a child under the regency of her mother. She attained her majority in 1160 and immediately made her presence felt by playing a major role in the revolt that broke out late that year. According to the contemporary chronicler known as Pseudo-Falcandus and Archbishop Romuald II of Salerno, several counts led by Count Robert III of Loritello conspired to have the Admiral Maio of Bari assassinated. They offered Matthew Bonnellus, who was engaged to Maio's daughter, the hand of Clementia in marriage. Matthew assassinated Maio on 10 November 1160, but he never married Clementia.

According to Pseudo-Falcandus, "In Calabria the Countess of Catanzaro also defected to Robert, and had reinforced the powerful castle of Taberna with both knights and other necessities, so that if it happened that the king should cross the Straits, she could base herself there in safety together with her mother." When King William I crossed over from Sicily to Calabria in the spring of 1161, Clementia resisted him from the castle of Taverna for a year, but was forced to surrender in April 1162. Two of her relatives, Thomas and Alfred, had supported her and were brutally punished by the king. Clementia and her mother were imprisoned in Messina and then in Palermo.

It is not known exactly when Clementia was freed, but she was back in charge of the County of Catanzaro by 1165, when she ordered an inquest into the exactions the monastery of Santo Stefano del Bosco was forcing on the men of Badolato. In 1167, she was in Deliceto and Montellere in the diocese of Bovino, where she witnessed a grant by her mother to the church of San Cristoforo di Deliceto.

Clementia married Hugh Lupin the Elder around 1167, certainly by 1168. She retreated from public life after that. She is only mentioned again in an order of Pope Alexander III placing the hospital of Buonalbergo, which had been built by Berard, lord of Pietrabbondante, under the protection of the Holy See at the request of Clementia. This can be dated to between 1179 and 1181. The date of Clementia's death is unknown. Her husband was still living in 1190, but by 1195 he had been succeeded as count by their eldest son.

Clementia and Hugh had twin sons, Hugh Lupin the Younger, who succeeded to Catanzaro, and Jordan Lupin, who led a rebellion in Sicily in 1197.

Notes

References

Sources

Italo-Normans
12th-century women rulers
Women in medieval European warfare
Women in 12th-century warfare
Women in war in Italy
12th-century Italian women